The Binghamton Bearcats women's basketball team represents Binghamton University and is located in Vestal, New York. The team currently competes in the America East Conference and plays its home games at the Binghamton University Events Center. The Bearcats have not made an appearance in the Division I tournament since joining it in 2001, but they did make appearances in the Division III Tournament from 1995 to 1998 and Division II in 1999.

Postseason

NCAA Division II
The Bearcats made one appearance in the NCAA Division II women's basketball tournament. They had a combined record of 0–1.

NCAA Division III
The Bearcats appeared in the NCAA Division III Tournament four times, with a combined record of 0–4.

Year by year results

References

External links